Sławomir Napłoszek (born 29 July 1968) is a Polish archer. He competed in the men's individual and team events at the 1992 Summer Olympics.

References

1968 births
Living people
Polish male archers
Olympic archers of Poland
Archers at the 1992 Summer Olympics
Archers at the 2020 Summer Olympics
Sportspeople from Warsaw
European Games competitors for Poland
Archers at the 2015 European Games